Ostrov is a rural locality (a khutor) in Kachalinskoye Rural Settlement, Surovikinsky District, Volgograd Oblast, Russia. The population was 246 as of 2010.

Geography 
Ostrov is located near the Lisa River, 36 km northeast of Surovikino (the district's administrative centre) by road. Kachalin is the nearest rural locality.

References 

Rural localities in Surovikinsky District